Sicanthus is a genus of fungus weevils in the beetle family Anthribidae. There is one described species in Sicanthus, S. rhizophorae.

References

Further reading

 
 

Anthribidae
Articles created by Qbugbot